La 1 (The One) is a Spanish free-to-air television channel owned and operated by Televisión Española (TVE), the television division of state-owned public broadcaster Radiotelevisión Española (RTVE). It is the corporation's flagship television channel, and is known for broadcasting mainstream and generalist programming, including Telediario news bulletins, prime time drama, cinema and entertainment, and major breaking news, sports and special events.

History
It was launched on 28 October 1956 as the first regular television service in Spain. It was the only one until 15 November 1966, when TVE launched a second channel. As TVE held a monopoly on television broadcasting in the country, they were the only television channels until the first regional public television station was launched on 16 February 1983, when Euskal Telebista started broadcasting in the Basque Country. Commercial television was launched on 25 January 1990, when Antena 3 started broadcasting nationwide.

The channel was initially simply referred to as "Televisión Española" until the launch of its second channel in 1966. Since then it received other names, such as "Primera Cadena", "Primer Programa", "TVE-1", "TVE1" or "La Primera" until it adopted its current name "La 1" (La uno) in 2008. Its headquarters and main production centre is Prado del Rey in Pozuelo de Alarcón. Although almost all its programming is in Spanish and is the same for all of Spain, TVE has territorial centres in every autonomous community and produces and broadcasts some local programming in regional variations in each of them, such as local news bulletins, in the corresponding co-official language.

On 1 January 2010, TVE stopped broadcasting commercial advertising on all its channels, with only self promotions, institutional campaigns and sponsorships allowed.

With analog service discontinued on 3 April 2010, it have only been available free-to-air through the digital terrestrial television (DTT) ever since. La 1 and Teledeporte started its DDT HD resolution simulcasts on 31 December 2013, initially in 720p and later in 1080i.

Logos and identities

Criticism and controversy 
Due to its status as a public service and pioneer television channel in Spain, La 1 has been criticized on numerous occasions for aspects related to its programming. Within TVE's offer, the first channel has been characterized by a general offer that competes directly with a private television, relegating any alternative or public service space to La 2. This practice has been maintained even after the withdrawal of advertising in 2010.

The Association of Viewers and Radio Listeners (ATR) denounced in 2005 that La 1 had been the channel that had broken the Self-regulation Code on Television Content and Children the most times, a total of 169 times. For its part, the management of the channel assured that many of the documented complaints had been based on "subjective criteria".

Since 2014, there has been a debate on television schedules in Spain: for reasons of screen share, prime time had been delayed in recent years until 10:30 p.m. and many programs ended at dawn. That same year, TVE signed an agreement with the Ministry of Health, Social Services and Equality for a "healthy use of television", which implied bringing forward the programming hours and ending them before 00:00. However, La 1 has not fulfilled the commitment in its prime time and some spaces such as the MasterChef Celebrity final have even ended at two in the morning.

Information Services 
The most controversial aspect is the work of information services. The appointment of the presidency of RTVE, responsible in turn for the rest of the departments, has historically depended on the Congress of Deputies by absolute majority, without the need for consensus. For this reason, it is considered that the editorial line of the Telediario, the news program with the most audience in the entire group has been tilted in favor of the government in power, both during the Franco's dictatorship and in current democratic Spain. There have been denunciations of disinformation in the governments of Adolfo Suárez,​ Felipe González, y José María Aznar, in the latter case including a sentence from the National Court for "violation of trade union rights" in the news coverage of the 2002 general strike.

The government of José Luis Rodríguez Zapatero changed the system for electing the presidency of RTVE in 2006, through a consensus of two-thirds of Congress, with the intention of granting more independence to the information services. However, Mariano Rajoy's executive recovered the previous model in 2012 to resolve the power vacuum in the radio station. Since then, the TVE News Council (made up of the house's employees) has reported more than 70 cases of alleged malpractice on the newscast and on the weekly report, all of them related to current affairs: the various cases of corruption affecting the Popular Party, the Bárcenas case, the focus of the pro-sovereignty process in Catalonia, or the positioning of news in the rundown. In addition, some journalists have denounced the gestation of a "parallel newsroom" to which the most sensitive information would be entrusted.

In September 2017, the Cortes Generales approved a new election system on RTVE that recovers the previous consensus model and established a public contest for the election of the presidency. The new system was applied in February 2021, after three years of temporary administration of a sole provisional administrator.

References

External links
 Official site 

RTVE channels
1
Television channels and stations established in 1956
Spanish-language television stations
1956 establishments in Spain